Uncomplicated Firewall (UFW) is a program for managing a netfilter firewall designed to be easy to use. It uses a command-line interface consisting of a small number of simple commands, and uses iptables for configuration. UFW is available by default in all Ubuntu installations since 8.04 LTS. UFW has been available by default in all Debian installations since 10.

GUIs for Uncomplicated Firewall

Gufw is intended to be an easy, intuitive graphical user interface for managing Uncomplicated Firewall. It supports common tasks such as allowing or blocking pre-configured, common P2P, or individual ports. Gufw has been designed for Ubuntu, but is also available in Debian-based distributions and in Arch Linux; anywhere Python, GTK and UFW are available.

Features

References

External links

 Ubuntu Firewall – Information about Uncomplicated Firewall on Ubuntu
 Gufw – Official Gufw website
 Gufw – Community Documentation

Firewall software
Free network-related software
Free security software
Linux security software
Software that uses GTK
Software that uses PyGObject
Ubuntu

ast:Uncomplicated Firewall